Eduardo "Eddie" Rodríguez (born March 11, 1959) is a Cuban former Minor League Baseball player and current Major League Baseball coach for the Chicago White Sox of Major League Baseball (MLB).

Playing career
Rodríguez was drafted as a shortstop by the Baltimore Orioles in 1978 out of Miami High School and spent five seasons in the minors for the Orioles and California Angels.

Managerial career
He then became a coach, scout and manager in the Angels minor league system from 1983-1993 before joining the Toronto Blue Jays organization as a minor league field coordinator, a post he held on and off from 1994-2000. He also served as third base coach for the Blue Jays in 1998.  After a stint as third base coach for the US Olympics team in 2000 he served as a coach with the Arizona Diamondbacks, Montreal Expos, and  Washington Nationals. He was the manager of the Seattle Mariners AA team, the West Tenn Diamond Jaxx, in 2007 and before joining the Mariners for the 2008 season.

Rodríguez managed Team USA in the 2009 Baseball World Cup.

Rodríguez joined the San Diego Padres coaching staff for the 2016 season.

References

External links

 Retrosheet
 Career overview
 bio
 Seattle Times
 KOMO news

1959 births
Living people
California Angels coaches
California Angels scouts
Major League Baseball bench coaches
Major League Baseball first base coaches
Major League Baseball third base coaches
Minor league baseball managers
Bluefield Orioles players
Holyoke Millers players
Miami Orioles players
Quad Cities Angels players
Redwood Pioneers players
Montreal Expos coaches
Washington Nationals coaches
Arizona Diamondbacks coaches
Toronto Blue Jays coaches
Seattle Mariners coaches
Kansas City Royals coaches
Baseball players from Havana